Mark Martin (born 1959) is an American racecar driver.

Mark Martin may also refer to:

 Mark Martin (politician) (born 1968), Arkansas Secretary of State
 Mark Martin (cartoonist) (born 1956), American cartoonist
 Mark Martin (judge) (born 1963), American judge
 Mark Martin (murderer) (born 1979), British serial killer
 Mark Martin (educator), British educator

See also
 Marcus Martins (born 1959), theologian
 Weather Wizard, also known as Mark Mardon